GII or variation, may refer to 

Gemmological Institute of India
Global Information Infrastructure
Global Innovation Index
Guyana Islamic Institute
Gender Inequality Index
Siguiri Airport, Guinea (by IATA code)
Grumman Gulfstream II (G-II) bizjet

See also

 
 
G2 (disambiguation)